Tawan Vihokratana (also known as Tay, born 20 July 1991) is a Thai actor, host, and model from Bangkok. An alumnus of Chulalongkorn University, Tawan started as one of the hosts of Bang Channel's Five Live Fresh in 2014. In the same year, he made his television debut with Room Alone 401-410 and earned widespread recognition after making it in CLEO Thailand's 50 Most Eligible Bachelors of 2014. He played the main role as Pete in Kiss: The Series (2016), and in 2018 became one of the new hosts of School Rangers together with other male artists from GMMTV. He went on to reprise his role as Pete in Kiss Me Again (2018), Our Skyy (2018) and in Dark Blue Kiss (2019).

Early life and education
Tawan was born in Bangkok, Thailand. Focusing on science and mathematics, he completed his high school education at Suankularb Wittayalai School. He initially took up a bachelor's degree in chemistry from the Faculty of Science at Chulalongkorn University (CU) but decided to shift and take up instead a bachelor's degree in economics from the Faculty of Economics at the same school.

Career
He was introduced in 2014 as one of the six new hosts of Five Live Fresh, a youth-oriented music television program of the now-defunct Bang Channel. Among his fellow hosts were Thitipoom Techaapaikhun and Jumpol Adulkittiporn.

He made his television debut in the same year with Room Alone 401-410 where he played a supporting role as Warm. He also became part of Ugly Duckling: Don't (2015). In 2016, he got a supporting role in U-Prince Series: The Foxy Pilot (2016) and Kiss: The Series (2016) where he played the role of Pete.

In 2017, he starred in the main role as Alan in the drama series Secret Seven: The Series.

He later became known for his main role as Pete in Kiss Me Again (2018) and Dark Blue Kiss (2019). He also played the role of Shin in 3 Will Be Free (2019). He also hosted the food web series TayNew Meal Date along with Thitipoom Techaapaikhun.

In 2020, he joined the cast I'm Tee, Me Too as Teedo and had a guest role in The Gifted: Graduation. He is also one of the hosts of Friend Club together with Jumpol Adulkittiporn and Weerayut Chansook. He's the current host of his own lifestyle/talk show, Krahai Lao.

In 2021, he starred as Tin in The Player.

Personal life
On 29 June 2017, he was ordained at the Wat Bowonniwet Vihara.

Filmography

Television

Discography

Awards and nominations

References

External links 

1991 births
Living people
Tawan Vihokratana
Tawan Vihokratana
Tawan Vihokratana
Tawan Vihokratana
Tawan Vihokratana
Tawan Vihokratana